Sandra C. Chapman CPhysis FInstP FRAS a British astrophysicist who is Professor of Astrophysics and Director of the Centre for Fusion, Space and Astrophysics at the University of Warwick. Her research considers nonlinear physics and planetary magnetospheres. She was awarded the 2022 Royal Astronomical Society Chapman Medal.

Early life and education 
Chapman studied physics at Imperial College London, where she was awarded an Exhibition Scholarship. She was diagnosed with temporal lobe epilepsy during her undergraduate degree. She remained at Imperial for her doctoral research, which considered the release of lithium in the near Earth plasma environment. After earning her doctorate, Chapman worked at Kyoto University, the Harvard Radcliffe Institute and the Max Planck Institute for the Physics of Complex Systems.

Research and career 
Chapman joined the University of Warwick in 1995. In 2000 she became the first woman to become a professor of astrophysics at the University of Warwick.

Chapman studies the dynamical interactions of planetary magnetospheres. She has shown that they release energy in unpredictable intervals, and behave as multi-scale, coupled systems. Her research on magnetic storms informed the strategy of the Magnetospheric Multiscale Mission. Alongside her scientific research, Chapman is an artist, and in 2003 held a NESTA fellowship to create art with the British Antarctic Survey.

To perform her investigations, Chapman makes use of non-linear physics. She has applied her understanding to the aurora, to quantify the risk of extreme space weather and to better understand solar activity. In 2017, she was awarded a Fulbright Program Fellowship to spend a year at Boston University and identify ways to protect the planet from space weather. 

In 2022, Chapman was awarded the Royal Astronomical Society Chapman Medal.

Awards and honours 
 1993 EGS Young Scientists' Medal
 1994 COSPAR Zeldovich Medal 
 2014 James Dungey Lecture
 2017 Fulbright-Lloyd's of London Scholar
 2020 American Geophysical Union Ed Lorenz Lecture
 2021 Lloyd's of London Science of Risk Prize
 2022 Royal Astronomical Society Chapman Medal

Selected publications

References

Living people
Alumni of Imperial College London
Academics of the University of Warwick
British astrophysicists
20th-century British physicists
21st-century British physicists
Year of birth missing (living people)